Omar, also spelled Umar (c. 584–644), was the second caliph of Islam.

It also may refer to:

Name
 Omar (name), Arabic name (including a list of people named Omar, Omer, Umar, Umer, or other variants)

Film and television
 Omar (film), a 2013 film
 Umar (film), a 2006 Bollywood film directed by Karan Razdan
 Omar (TV series), a 2012 historical television series on MBC
 Omar Little, a character from The Wire, a television series

Music
 Omar (album), 2005 album by Omar Naber
 Omar Lye-Fook or Omar (born 1968), British soul singer

Places
 Omar, Kunar, a village in Afghanistan
 Omar, Bushehr, a village in Bushehr Province, Iran
 Omar, Sulu, a municipality in the Philippines
 Omar, Delaware, an unincorporated community
 Omar, Ohio, an unincorporated community
 Omar, West Virginia, a census-designated place

Other uses
 Omar (candy), a Finnish confectionery brand
 Umar (Marvel Comics), a comic book supervillian
 The ICAO code for Arzanah Airport
 The Oil Monopoly Alliance Regime (OMAR), a fictional organization in the Vigilante 8 vehicular combat video game series
 The Omar, a fictional cult in Deus Ex: Invisible War
 ASM-N-6 Omar, a U.S. Navy air-to-surface missile
 Hurricane Omar, a 2008 Atlantic hurricane
 Organization for Mine Clearance and Afghan Rehabilitation, a charitable non-governmental organisation

See also
 Masjid Umar, a list of mosques
 Omagh, the county town of County Tyrone in Northern Ireland
 Omarolluk, a feature sometimes found in sedimentary rocks
 Omer (disambiguation)
 Pact of Umar (c. 717 AD), an edict of the caliph Umar ibn Khattab
 Umar Khel, a division of the Pashtun tribe Kakazai
 Umar Marvi, a Sindhi love story